Hordaland is a former county of Norway.

Hordaland may also refer to:
 Hordaland (newspaper), published in Voss, Norway
 Hordaland County Municipality
 Hordaland Formation, a geologic formation in Norway
 Hordaland Police District
 Petty kingdoms of Norway#Kingdom of Hordaland

See also
 Coat of arms of Hordaland
 Eirik of Hordaland, 9th century king of Hordaland
 Hordaland Folkeblad, a Norwegian newspaper published in Norheimsund
 Hordalands doedskvad, an album by Norwegian band Taake
 List of churches in Hordaland
 List of County Governors of Hordaland
 List of municipalities in Hordaland, Norway
 List of villages in Hordaland